Regi Lushkja (born 17 May 1996) is an Albanian professional footballer who plays as a midfielder for Tirana.

Club career

Early career
Lushkja started his youth career at Besa in 2011. During the 2012–13 season he played for the under-17 side managed by Ylli Teliti forming a strong duo striker partnership with Ardit Deliu, where in the first half of the season the duo scored 90% off all Besa Under-17 goals. He gained entry with the first team during the 2014–15 season where he soon established himself as a starter under coach Bledar Sinella playing 15 matches as a starter and 3 other as a substitute. In the next season he retained his starting place playing 12 matches and completing 10 as full-90 minutes.

Laçi
On 20 January 2016, Lushkja joined Laçi for an undisclosed fee. He made his competitive debut later on 7 February in a 0–3 home defeat to Tirana valid for the matchday 20.

International career
Lushkja has represented Albania at under-19 level, making his debut on 29 August 2014 in a friendly against Bulgaria.

Following injures of 3 players at Albania national under-21 football team, Qazim Laçi, Leonardo Maloku & Emanuele Ndoj during the gathering for the Friendly match against France U21 on 5 June 2017 and the 2019 UEFA European Under-21 Championship qualification opening match against Estonia U21 on 12 June 2017, coach Alban Bushi chose Lushkja among Agim Zeka as a replacement. He was not part of the 18-man squad which featured in the opening match of the qualifiers against Estonia U21.

Career statistics

Club

Honours
Besa Kavajë
 Kupa e Shqipërisë runner-up: 2015–16

Laçi
 Kupa e Shqipërisë runner-up: 2017–18
 Superkupa e Shqipërisë runner-up: 2018

Sheriff Tiraspol
 Moldovan National Division: 2021–22
 Moldovan Cup: 2021–22
 Moldovan Super Cup runner-up: 2021

References

External links
 Regi Lushkja FSHF.org
 

1996 births
Living people
Footballers from Kavajë
Albanian footballers
Association football midfielders
Albania youth international footballers
Albania under-21 international footballers
Besa Kavajë players
KF Laçi players
Kategoria e Parë players
Kategoria Superiore players
FC Sheriff Tiraspol players
Moldovan Super Liga players
Albanian expatriate footballers
Albanian expatriate sportspeople in Moldova
Expatriate footballers in Moldova